Blome is a surname of:

 Fanny Blomé (born 1990) is a Swedish model 
 Gert Blomé (born 1934), Swedish ice hockey player
 Heinz-Jürgen Blome (1946–2012) German football player
 Kurt Blome (1894–1969), German scientist 
 Nikolaus Blome (born 1963), German journalist
 Richard Blome (1635–1705), British publisher and cartographer
 Blome (composer), 15th-century English composer

Surnames from nicknames